Craig Murdock (born 24 October 1973) is an English former professional rugby league footballer who played as a . Murdock played for Hensingham ARLFC (in Hensingham, Whitehaven), Wigan, Hull Sharks, Salford City Reds and Hull Kingston Rovers.

Playing career
Born in Cumbria, Murdock started his professional career with Wigan in 1993 after being signed from amateur side Hensingham. He scored 23 tries in 68 appearances for the club, and took part in the Clash of the Codes match against Bath, scoring two tries in the match played under rugby union rules.

In 1998, he joined Hull Sharks, initially on loan before signing a permanent deal. He also went on to play for Salford City Reds and Hull Kingston Rovers

Media career
After his playing career ended, Murdock worked as a commentator for BBC Radio Humberside for almost a decade, but was forced to leave the role in 2014 due to a "conflict of interest" with his work as a player agent. He was subsequently employed by the Hull Daily Mail as a columnist.

Honours
 RFL Championship: 1994–95, 1995–96
 Premiership: 1996

References

External links
 Craig Murdock Wigan Career Page on the Wigan RL Fansite.
 Statistics at rugbyleagueproject.org

1973 births
Living people
English rugby league players
Hull F.C. players
Hull Kingston Rovers players
Rugby league halfbacks
Rugby league players from Whitehaven
Salford Red Devils players
Wigan Warriors players